Sugiyamaemyces is a genus of fungi in the family Laboulbeniaceae. A monotypic genus, it contains the single species Sugiyamaemyces oroussetii.

References

External links
Sugiyamaemyces at Index Fungorum

Laboulbeniomycetes
Monotypic Laboulbeniomycetes genera